Marcel Stanislas Marie Joseph Ambroise Pocard du Cosquer de Kerviler (11 July 1910 – 27 January 1989) was a French naval officer and competitive sailor. He competed at the 1948 Summer Olympics and the 1952 Summer Olympics.

Kerviler joined the French Navy in 1930, enrolling at the École Navale. He was first commissioned as a junior officer in 1932, gaining promotion to lieutenant de vaisseau in 1942, and capitaine de corvette in 1950. He rose to the rank of contre-amiral. Among his many honours, he was a recipient of the Croix de Guerre 1939–1945, and appointed as an officer of the Legion d'Honneur, an officer of the Ordre du Mérite Maritime, an Officier d'Académie, and a commander of the Ordre du Mérite Sportif.

Kerviler competed in many international sailing regattas, representing France. He also wrote several books.

References

External links
 

1910 births
1989 deaths
French male sailors (sport)
Olympic sailors of France
Sailors at the 1948 Summer Olympics – Dragon
Sailors at the 1952 Summer Olympics – Dragon
Sportspeople from Angers
École Navale alumni
French Navy officers
Officiers of the Légion d'honneur
Officers of the Ordre du Mérite Maritime
Officiers of the Ordre des Palmes Académiques
Recipients of the Croix de Guerre 1939–1945 (France)
20th-century French people